"Reckless" is a song written by Michael Clark and Jeff Stevens, and recorded by American country music group Alabama. It was released in August 1993 as the first single from their album, Cheap Seats. The song was their final number one the Billboard Hot Country Singles & Tracks (now Hot Country Songs) chart until June 2011, when they reached the number one position again with a guest vocal on Brad Paisley's "Old Alabama".

Content
The song's narrator wants to take his lover in his Thunderbird, and wants for him and her to forget and care less about their current lives and live and love recklessly.

Critical reception
Deborah Evans Price, of Billboard magazine reviewed the song unfavorably, saying that it is a "recycled, B-movie Bruce tune." She goes on to say that if Alabama keeps recording songs like these than the band "might as well go ahead and change its name to New Jersey."

Chart positions

Year-end charts

References

1993 singles
1993 songs
Alabama (American band) songs
Songs written by Michael Clark (songwriter)
Songs written by Jeff Stevens (singer)
Song recordings produced by Josh Leo
RCA Records singles